Greg David Smith (born 3 March 1979) is a British Conservative politician. Previously deputy leader of Hammersmith and Fulham Council, he has been the Member of Parliament (MP) for the Buckingham constituency since the 2019 general election.

Early life
Smith studied at Bromsgrove School and then the University of Birmingham. He has had a career in design and marketing. Smith was a trustee of Riverside Studios from 2008 to 2019.

Career
Smith was a councillor on Hammersmith and Fulham Council between May 2006 and May 2018, and was also deputy leader of the council. In 2014, the Conservatives lost control of the council to Labour in the local elections, and Smith was appointed as Leader of the Conservative group. He stood down from the council in the 2018 elections.

At the 2017 general election, he stood as the Conservative candidate in Hayes and Harlington, which has generally been a safe seat for the Labour Party in recent years. He lost to John McDonnell, with 28.6% of the vote.

In October 2019, Smith was announced as the Conservative candidate for the Buckingham constituency, following the announcement by the Speaker of the House of Commons John Bercow that he would stand down at the end of October. Bercow had held the seat since 1997, having been elected as a Conservative.

Smith announced his opposition to HS2 and the East West Expressway as part of his campaign. He is a Brexit supporter and helped Boris Johnson in his Conservative party leadership campaign.

Smith opposes a Ministry of Justice plan to build a third prison in his constituency.

Smith was appointed as a member of the Transport Select Committee in February 2020. He is the co-chair of the Free-Market Forum. In May 2021 he became chairman of the Minimally Invasive Cancer Therapies All-party parliamentary group.

Controversies
In October 2020, following a national campaign by footballer Marcus Rashford, the Labour Party put down a House of Commons motion to extend the free school meals food vouchers to cover the October 2020 half-term break. Many local councils, individuals and businesses volunteered to offer assistance to FareShare to help them serve people in need. Despite Smith’s vote against the motion, he applied to one such volunteer organisation (a cafe in his constituency at Ivinghoe) for a photo opportunity to "help get the meals ready for distribution or help with delivery". The request was refused by the cafe owners with national publicity.

Personal life
He moved to Wendover, Buckinghamshire, with his second wife, Annalise, in 2017.

In 2021, Smith moved to the Buckinghamshire village of Chearsley.

In 2021, he was asked to look into roadside pollution of extremely rare chalk streams. Out of a global count of less than 300, his constituency is responsible for the maintenance of more than 100 of these. He has expressed his views that all natural chalk streams within Buckinghamshire will be restored to their original status.

References

External links

1979 births
Living people
Conservative Party (UK) councillors
Conservative Party (UK) MPs for English constituencies
Councillors in the London Borough of Hammersmith and Fulham
UK MPs 2019–present
People educated at Bromsgrove School